The Mil Mi-6 (NATO reporting name Hook), given the article number izdeliye 50 and company designation V-6, is a Soviet/Russian heavy transport helicopter that was designed by the Mil design bureau. It was built in large numbers for both military and civil use and was the largest helicopter in production until the Mil Mi-26 was put in production in 1980.

Design and development
The Mi-6 resulted from a joint civil-military requirement for a very large vertical-lift aircraft, which could be used to add mobility in military operations as well as assist in the exploration and development of the expansive central and eastern regions of the USSR. Flown for the first time on 5 June 1957, the Mi-6 was the first Soviet turboshaft-powered production helicopter.

The R-7 gearbox and rotor head developed for the project have a combined weight of 3200 kg, which is greater than the two turboshaft engines.

Variable-incidence winglets were first mounted on the craft's sides in 1960 to the 30 pre-series units. These wings provide approximately 20% of the lift required during cruise flight.

The Mi-6 was by far the world's largest helicopter when it was designed in 1954–56; with a maximum load capacity of 12,000 kg. In its early days, the Mi-6 set many world records, including one for sheer circuit speed at 340 km/h (211 mph). , the Mi-6 still holds the FAI record of fastest 5-tonne lift over 1,000 km, in which it flew 284 km/h in 1962.

From 1959 to 1972 at least 500 units were built for various general-transport, utility, firefighting and flying-crane duties, the last two sub-types not being fitted with the large fixed wings, which in other versions bear part of the lift in cruising flight and thus enable higher speeds to be attained. The twin nose wheels and large low-pressure main wheels do not retract.

Normally flown by a crew of five or more, the Mi-6 seats 65 armed troops and can alternatively carry 41 stretcher (litter) patients and two attendants, or a wide range of bulky loads, including vehicles, loaded through rear clamshell doors. In exercises, fleets of these aircraft have airlifted many kinds of weapons, including FROG-7 rockets on their PT-76 tracked chassis, as well as large radars and heavy artillery. All Soviet armoured personnel carriers, armoured cars and light mechanised infantry combat vehicles can be carried.

The CIS Interstate Aviation Committee cancelled the Mi-6's Type Certificate in October 2002 after the crash of RA-21074 in the Taimyr Peninsula. There have also been reports that the wooden tail rotor blades have reached the end of their service life.

Variants

Data from: Mil's heavylift helicopters : Mi-6, Mi-10, V-12 and Mi-26 
izdeliye 50 The product or article number for the V-6 prototype.
V-6 (Zavod No.329 Moscow) First prototype series.
Mi-6 (NATO – Hook-A) Heavy-lift civil and military transport helicopter.
Mi-6A Troopships and commercial transport helicopters built to a new baseline standard with improvements in reliability and new avionics.
Mi-6AYa(NATO – Hook-D) OKB designation for the Mi-6VzPU and Mi-22 airborne command posts, with SLAR.
Mi-6APS (PS – poiskovo-spasahtel'nyy – search and rescue) A limited number of search and rescue helicopters converted from Mi-6A standard aircraft.
Mi-6ATZ (TZ – toplivo-zapravshchik – fuel tanker) Fuel transport helicopter variant of the Mi-6A.
Mi-6 Boorlak (boorlak – barge hauler) Prototype ASW/MCM helicopters, used for research into ASW equipment when delays to the mission equipment forced cancellation.
Mi-6BUS(NATO – Hook-C) (Also Mi-6AYa and Mi-22) airborne command post helicopter of 1975.
Mi-6L (Also Mi-6LL: Letayushchaya laboratoriya) Flying laboratory variant with D-25VF engines used for flight improvements of the Mi-6 and testbed for the powerplant of the Mi-12.
Mi-6M (M – morskoy – maritime) Anti-submarine variant armed with four aerial torpedoes and ASW rockets, and equipped with various experimental ASW systems. First built in 1963 and modified in 1965 for the "Barge Hauler" program.
Mi-6P (P – passazheerskiy – passenger) Passenger transport helicopter, with accommodation for 80 passengers. One prototype was converted from a stock Mi-6.
Mi-6PP (PP – postanovshchik pomekh – ECM aircraft) A prototype Counter-ELINT aircraft to protect air-defense radars from enemy ECM and/or ELINT activities .
Mi-6PR (Protivodeystviya Radiorazvedke) Development in 1962 for jammer/electronic warfare variant.
Mi-6PRTBV (podvizhnaya raketno-tekhnicheskaya baza vertlyotnovo tipa) A few modified as mobile missile maintenance technical bases and missile transporters.
Mi-6PS (PS – poiskovo-spasahtel'nyy – search and rescue) Search and rescue (SAR) helicopter developed in 1966 for pick-up of the landed Vostok and Soyuz space modules.
Mi-6PSA Alternative designation, used in some sources, for the Mi-6APS.
Mi-6PZh (PZh – pozharnyy – fire fighting) Fire fighting variant, with a  tank in the cabin and six  bags suspended from the fuselage. The sole prototype crashed in France fighting a fire, soon after display at the 27th Paris Air Show.

Mi-6PZh2 A second firefighting helicopter prototype and several conversions with a steerable water cannon in the nose.
Mi-6R (R – Retranslyator – ) Specialised radio communications relay variant developed in 1974, prototype conversions only.
Mi-6RVK (RVK – raketno-vertolyotny kompleks – heliborne missile system) Tested in 1965 loaded with 9K53, 9K73, 9M21 Luna-MV or 8K114 mobile missile systems.
Mi-6S Medical evacuation helicopter, which can carry 41 litters.
Mi-6T(NATO – Hook-A) Military transport helicopter, which can seat up to 70 people on tip-up seats along the cabin sides, with additional seat along the center-line.
Mi-6TP Convertible freight/passenger helicopter.
Mi-6TZ (TZ – toplivo-zapravshchik – fuel tanker) Fuel transport helicopter to refuel vehicles and helicopters on the ground.
Mi-6TZ-SV (TZ-SV – toplivo-zapravshchik – sookhoputnyye voyska – fuel tanker-ground forces) Fuel transport helicopter to refuel vehicles on the ground.
Mi-6VR (VR - Vodoley – Aquarius) A water spraying research helicopter to test helicopter anti-icing systems.
Mi-6VKP (NATO – Hook-B) (VKP – vozdooshnnyy poonkt – airborne command post) Command post transport helicopter to deploy comms and war room on the ground, not usable in flight.
Mi-6VUS (NATO – Hook-D) airborne command post with SLAR.
Mi-6VzPU (NATO – Hook-D) Service designation of the Mi-6AYa airborne command post with SLAR, entered service as the Mi-22.
Mi-6? Developed in 1962 with collapsible BU-75BRM drilling rig for oil exploration in Siberia. Exact designation unknown.
Mi-6? Missile fuel transport to supplement the Mi-6PRTBV
Mi-6? An experimental conversion in 1976 for testing the rotor system of the Mi-26.
Mi-6? An engine testbed, fitted with Soloviev D-25VF engines, as developed for the Mil V-12.
Mi-22 VVS designation of the Mi-6AYa/VzPU airborne command post helicopters.

Operators

Military operators

Algerian Air Force

Belarus Air Force

People's Liberation Army

Egyptian Air Force

Ethiopian Air Force

Indonesian Air Force

Iraqi Air Force

Kazakh Air Force

Laotian Air Force

Pakistan Army

Peruvian Air Force
Peruvian Army
 Polish People's Republic
Polish Air Force

Russian Air Force

Ukrainian Air Force

Aeroflot
Soviet Air Force

Vietnamese Air Force

Specifications (Mi-6)

See also

Notes

References

Bibliography

External links

Cockpit pictures

Mi-06
Mil aircraft
1950s Soviet cargo aircraft
1950s Soviet military transport aircraft
1950s Soviet helicopters
Twin-turbine helicopters
Aircraft first flown in 1957
Military transport helicopters